Robert Hawkins may refer to:

People
Robert Hawkins (artist) (born 1951), American artist
Robert Hawkins (Manitoba politician) (1879–1962), politician in Manitoba, Canada
Robert Hawkins (Northwest Territories politician), engineering technologist and politician from the Northwest Territories, Canada
Robert A. Hawkins (1988–2007), gunman in the 2007 Westroads Mall shooting
Robert Hawkins (boxer) (born 1970), heavyweight journeyman fighter
Rob Hawkins (born 1983), English rugby union player
Robert Hawkins (basketball) (1954–1993), American basketball player
Robert Hawkins (golfer), founder of the United Golf Association in the U.S. 
Robert Hawkins (sport shooter) (1875–1945), British Olympic shooter
Robert Henry Hawkins (1892–1989), priest of the Church of England and Canon of Windsor

Fiction
Robert Hawkins (Jericho character)
Robert Hawkins, father of Virgil Hawkins (a.k.a. Static) and Sharon Hawkins
Robert Hawkins, a main character in the 2008 film Cloverfield